Lampi is a former municipality in the Rethymno regional unit, Crete, Greece. Since the 2011 local government reform, it is part of the municipality Agios Vasileios, of which it is a municipal unit. Population 4,161 (2011). The seat of the municipality was in Spili.

References

Populated places in Rethymno (regional unit)